Lucien Dechene (born August 17, 1925) is a Canadian retired professional hockey player who played 798 games in the Western Hockey League with the New Westminster Royals, Vancouver Canucks, Brandon Regals, Saskatoon Quakers, and Calgary Stampeders. He also played one season with the Quebec Aces in the American Hockey League.  He was named the WHL's Outstanding Goaltender five times, and was twice awarded the league's George Leader Cup as its most outstanding player.

External links
 

1925 births
Possibly living people
Ice hockey people from Quebec City
New Westminster Royals (WHL) players
Vancouver Canucks (WHL) players
Brandon Regals players
Saskatoon Quakers players
Calgary Stampeders (WHL) players
Quebec Aces (AHL) players
Canadian ice hockey goaltenders